The 2016 Istria Cup was the fourth edition of the Istria Cup, an invitational women's football tournament held annually in Istria, Croatia. It took place from 2 to 7 March 2016, at the same time as the 2016 Algarve Cup, 2016 SheBelieves Cup and 2016 Cyprus Cup.

Venues

Group stage

Group A

Group B

References

External links
Official website

Istria Cup
International association football competitions hosted by Croatia
Istria Cup
2015–16 in Northern Ireland association football
2015–16 in French women's football
2015–16 in Slovenian football
2015–16 in Polish football
2015–16 in Hungarian football
2015–16 in Slovak football
2016 in American women's soccer
2016